Taner Gülleri (born 29 April 1976) is a Turkish football coach and former player.

Career
Gülleri was the top scorer of the TFF First League in 2008 with 21 goals.

References

1976 births
Living people
Turkish footballers
Süper Lig players
Adana Demirspor footballers
Kocaelispor footballers
Antalyaspor footballers
Kayserispor footballers
Sakaryaspor footballers
Bursaspor footballers
Sportspeople from Adana
Turkish football managers
Kartalspor managers
Association football forwards